Keeble Observatory  is an astronomical observatory owned and operated by Randolph-Macon College.  It is located in Ashland, Virginia (USA), named for Dr. William Houston Keeble, distinguished Professor of Physics at Randolph-Macon College from 1919 until his retirement in 1952. He was a member of Phi Beta Kappa, the American Physical Society, the American Association of Physics Teachers, the American Astronomical Society, and was a fellow of the American Association for the Advancement of Science. 

The first structure was opened in 1963 and housed a 12-inch Newtonian telescope. This building was razed in 2016. A new taller structure went into service the following year and houses a 40cm Ritchey-Chretien.

See also
 List of astronomical observatories

References

External links
Keeble Observatory Clear Sky Clock Forecasts of observing conditions.

Astronomical observatories in Virginia
Randolph–Macon College
1963 establishments in Virginia
Buildings and structures in Hanover County, Virginia